Kässbohrer or Käßbohrer may refer to:

Persons 
 Karl Heinrich Kässbohrer (1864–1922), German entrepreneur and vehicle constructor, founder of Karl Kässbohrer Fahrzeugwerke
 Karl Kässbohrer (1901–1973), German entrepreneur and vehicle constructor
 Otto Kässbohrer (1904–1989), German entrepreneur and vehicle constructor
 Philipp Käßbohrer (born 1983), German director of short films, music videos and commercials

Businesses and organizations 
 Karl Kässbohrer Fahrzeugwerke, former German automobile manufacturer
Kässbohrer Setra, former trade name for Setra buses
 Kässbohrer Fahrzeugwerke, German manufacturer of trailers for commercial vehicles, part of the Tirsan group
 Kässbohrer Geländefahrzeug, German manufacturer of snow and beach groomers
 Kässbohrer Transport Technik, Austrian manufacturer of car carriers and refrigerated vehicles and trailers